Jamshed Ismailov (born 12 January 1987) is a Tajikistani footballer who currently plays for Regar-TadAZ Tursunzoda. He is a member of the Tajikistan national football team in the 2010 FIFA World Cup qualification campaign.

Career statistics

International

Statistics accurate as of match played 4 June 2013

International goals

Honours
Regar-TadAZ
Tajik League (2): 2006, 2008
Tajik Cup (3): 2006, 2011, 2012
Tajik Supercup (3): 2011, 2012, 2013
AFC President's Cup (2): 2008, 2009

References

External links
 

1987 births
Living people
Tajikistani footballers
Tajikistan international footballers
Footballers at the 2006 Asian Games
Association football midfielders
Asian Games competitors for Tajikistan